b(0,+)-type amino acid transporter 1, also known as b(0,+)AT1, is a protein which in humans is encoded by the SLC7A9 gene.

Function 
This gene encodes a protein that belongs to a family of light subunits of amino acid transporters. This protein plays a role in the high-affinity and sodium-independent transport of cystine and neutral and dibasic amino acids, and appears to function in the reabsorption of cystine in the kidney tubule. The protein associates with the protein coded for by SLC3A1.

Clinical significance 
Mutations in this gene cause non-type I cystinuria, a disease that leads to cystine stones in the urinary system due to impaired transport of cystine and dibasic amino acids.

See also
 Heterodimeric amino acid transporter
 Solute carrier family

References 

Solute carrier family